Longs Drugs is an American chain owned by parent company CVS Health with approximately 70 drugstores throughout the state of Hawaii and formerly in the Continental US.

Before being acquired by parent company in 2008, it was a chain of over 500 stores, located primarily on the West Coast of the United States. Besides Hawaii, it had stores located in California, Nevada, Arizona, Alaska, Colorado, Oregon, Utah and Washington, and was headquartered in Walnut Creek, California.

History
The first store was founded in 1938 as Longs Self-Service Drugs, by brothers Thomas and Joseph Long (son-in-law of Marion Barton Skaggs, co-founder of Safeway Inc.), when they opened their first store on Piedmont Avenue in Oakland, California. The first Longs in Hawaii opened on March 29, 1954, in Honolulu. By 1971, Longs reported sales of $169 million from its 54 stores. They were incorporated during the same year.

They expanded to Alaska in 1977, Arizona and Oregon in 1978, and Nevada in 1979. By 1982, Longs had 162 stores and exceeded $1 billion in sales. In 1987, Longs acquired 11 Osco drugstores in California and one in Colorado. They also sold 15 stores in Arizona to Osco. Their sales passed $2 billion for the first time in 1990. In 1993, Longs purchased Bill's Drugs, a 20-store chain located in Northern California, for $23.9 million.

In 1995, Longs formed Integrated Health Concepts, a Pharmacy Benefit Management company. They also closed 2 stores located in Alaska. In 1997, Longs and American Drug Stores Inc. (subsidiary of Albertson's Inc. at the time) merged their pharmacy benefit management companies to create RxAmerica, with each company retaining 50% ownership.

In 1998, Longs acquired 20 Drug Emporium stores from Western Drug Distributors, Inc. 18 of the stores were located in western Washington and two in the Portland, Oregon. Rite Aid sold Longs 32 stores located in California for $150 million in October 1999, which itself were former PayLess Drug locations since 1998.

On September 17, 2001, Longs exercised its option to acquire Albertson's interest in RxAmerica and established full ownership of the PBM.

In 2003, Bob Long stepped down as Chairman and CEO, marking the first time in the history of Longs Drugs that a member of the founding family was not involved in the company. In 2004 Longs acquired Sacramento, California-based American Diversified Pharmacies (ADP), a mail order pharmacy. On January 1, 2006, RxAmerica began offering Medicare Part D prescription drug plans in all 50 states and the District of Columbia.

In June 2006, Longs purchased 21 retail pharmacies, from Network Pharmaceuticals, Inc. The Network pharmacies are located close to the point of care (such as hospitals, clinics, and medical office buildings), and were much smaller than Long's traditional retail stores. Longs also purchased 4 stores from PharMerica, Inc., a subsidiary of AmerisourceBergen Corporation.

By 2008, CVS/pharmacy acquired Longs Drugs, and rebranded all pharmacies outside Hawaii by the summer of the following year. In 2011, CVS closed the  flagship superstore on 5100 Broadway in Oakland, CA, due to property redevelopment plans.

Acquisition

On August 12, 2008, Longs Drugs announced that they were being acquired by CVS Health, the operator of the national CVS/pharmacy chain of drugstores. CVS bought the 521 Longs locations to expand its presence on the West Coast, primarily in California. The acquisition also included access to the Hawaii market. CVS Health paid a total of $2.54 billion to acquire all outstanding shares of Longs Drugs, and hoped to save upwards of $100 million in 2009 and $140–$150 million in 2010 in expenses from synergies attained from the business combination. On September 12, 2008, the Walgreen Co. stepped in with an offer representing a $3.50 per share premium over the cash purchase price offered by CVS.  However, Walgreens dropped their offer on October 8, allowing CVS' deal to progress. On October 29, CVS had secured 78.07% of Longs shares, and Longs was merged into CVS the next day on October 30. According to the San Francisco Chronicle, CVS retained the Longs Drugs name in the Hawaii stores "because of its high name recognition and the geographical separation." Before the merger, CVS had no full-service stores in Northern California or Hawaii.

Longs in popular culture
Although a California-based company, Longs had maintained stores in Hawaii long enough to become a local establishment.  Its first Hawaii store, in downtown Honolulu, opened March 29, 1954.  In 2005, Honolulu Advertiser columnist Lee Cataluna published a short-story collection, Folks You Meet in Longs, and Other Stories. It is based on Cataluna's eponymous play which premiered August 2003 at Kumu Kahua Theatre.

Hawaii expansion
In an effort to combat Walgreens' expansion in Hawaii, CVS began a statewide expansion in 2010, with many new locations within a mile of an existing Longs Drugs. However, CVS closed two 'underperforming' stores in Honolulu in 2019.

References

External links
Longs Drugs web site
Longs Drugs Weekly Ad Page

Defunct pharmacies of the United States
Companies based in Contra Costa County, California
Skaggs family
Retail companies established in 1938
Defunct companies based in the San Francisco Bay Area
Retail companies based in California
1938 establishments in California
CVS Health
Health care companies based in Hawaii
2008 mergers and acquisitions